Beginnings is the debut studio album by Australian musician Rick Springfield. The album was released on August 28, 1972, by Sparmac Records.
This album was issued in the U.S. on Capitol Records (SMAS-11047).

Critical reception 
Reviewing in Christgau's Record Guide: Rock Albums of the Seventies (1981), Robert Christgau wrote: "Would you believe second-generation Emitt Rhodes? Well, this is an exemplary singles album—gimmicky, banal, full of filler, and filled out with a few more catchy little numbers to go with "Speak to the Sky". Recommended follow-ups: 'Hooky Jo' to keep on rock-rock-rocking, 'If I Didn't Mean to Love You' for a future in Vegas balladeering."

Track listing
All tracks composed by Rick Springfield

Charts

Personnel
Rick Springfield - vocals, guitar, banjo, organ, harpsichord, piano
Del Newman - arrangements
Technical
Robin Geoffrey Cable - engineer
John Hoernle - art direction
Bob Willoughby - photography

References

External links 
 

1972 debut albums
Rick Springfield albums
Albums recorded at Trident Studios